The Battle of Crooked Billet was a battle in the Philadelphia campaign of the American Revolutionary War fought on May 1, 1778 near the Crooked Billet Tavern (present-day Hatboro, Pennsylvania).  In the skirmish action, British forces under the command of Major John Graves Simcoe launched a surprise attack against Brigadier General John Lacey and three regiments of Pennsylvania militia, who were literally caught sleeping.  The British inflicted significant damage, and Lacey and his forces were forced to retreat into neighboring Bucks County.

Background

The British Army, led by General William Howe, had captured New York City in 1776 and Philadelphia in 1777.  Even after the capture of Forts Mifflin and Mercer, which had previously prevented the resupply of British-occupied Philadelphia by sea, the British relied heavily upon the overland route between New York City and Philadelphia for the movement of men, supplies and communication.  British troops also regularly foraged for supplies in the countryside around the city.

Since December, Washington and the Continental Army were in winter quarters at Valley Forge, northwest of Philadelphia. John Lacey (who had been promoted to Brigadier General and commander of the Pennsylvania militia in January at the age of 23), was tasked by Washington with patrolling the region north of Philadelphia, between the Delaware and Schuylkill Rivers.  Washington ordered Lacey and the militia to prevent farmers from taking their goods into Philadelphia to sell to the British (who paid high prices, in gold), and to protect patriots in the region from harassment by British and Loyalist troops.

Washington was highly critical of both Pennsylvania's militia recruitment and Lacey's performance.  Pennsylvania, despite promising 1,000 militia to patrol that area, had been unable to raise that many, and Washington was considering calling in militia from neighboring states. Washington wrote that militia stipulated by the state had never been above half kept up and that General Lacey had only 70 men left in the field.  Lacey had not been as effective as Brigadier General James Potter at interdicting trade with the British, and Washington hoped Potter, off on leave, would soon return.

Prelude
In late April Lacey began a series of maneuvers and patrols across the area that ended with his arrival on April 27 at the Crooked Billet Tavern in present-day Hatboro.  One of his straggling companies was attacked by a British patrol, and Loyalist spies informed John Graves Simcoe, leader of the Loyalist Queen's Rangers, of Lacey's whereabouts.

In Philadelphia, General Howe ordered Simcoe, to "secure the country and facilitate the inhabitants bringing in their produce to market."  During the winter of 1778, British and Loyalist troops repeatedly led raids into Bucks County, despite the presence of Lacey and the militia.

In April, Simcoe secured permission from Howe to launch an attack on Lacey and his militia.  On the afternoon of April 30, he and Lieutenant Colonel Robert Abercromby led their contingent of troops out of Philadelphia and towards the Crooked Billet.  By then Lacey's troops numbered about 400, including fresh arrivals from Cumberland and York Counties.  That night Lacey ordered Lieutenant William Neilsen to begin a patrol between 2:00 and 3:00 am, and ordered the brigade of Thomas Downey to stand on alert.  Neilsen failed to follow his orders, and his patrol only left camp shortly before daybreak on May 1.  They had not gone far when they spotted the advancing British.

Battle
The British troops arrived at Crooked Billet at daybreak on May 1.  Simcoe had planned a "pincer"-type attack, with his troops attacking from the north and east, and Abercromby's troops from the south and west.  Lacey's pickets, in place to warn against any type of threat, noticed the British troops, but failed to fire off a warning shot for fear of being killed or captured.  Neilsen sent a runner back to the camp to raise the alarm, but he never arrived.  Surprised and outnumbered, the militia were soon routed and forced to retreat into Warminster, losing their supplies and equipment at their bivouac site.

An account of the battle, published on May 5 in Philadelphia's Royal Pennsylvania Gazette, reads as follows:

On Thursday night last, a small party of the British infantry, dragoons, and Queen's rangers, with a few of Capt. HOVEDEN's Pennsylvania, and Capt. JAMES's Chester dragoons, left the city about eleven o'clock, and proceeded up the Old York road.  About a mile beyond the Billet they fell in with Lacey's brigade of militia, consisting of about 500 men, and immediately attacked them: Lacey, at first, made some appearance of opposition, but, in a few seconds, was thrown into confusion, obliged to retreat with precipitation, and were pursued about 4 miles. They left between 80-100 dead on the field; and on Friday, between 50-60 prisoners, besides waggoners, with 10 of their waggons loaded with baggage, flour, salt, whiskey, &c. were brought in by the troops on their return: What number of rebels were wounded, we have not been able to learn. Besides the above waggons, 3 were burnt after taking out the horses; also all the huts and what baggage could not be brought off. The royal party did not lose a single man on this occasion, and have only 7 men wounded, and 2 horses killed.

Aftermath
As a result of this engagement, the American forces lost ten wagons full of much-needed supplies, and Lacey had almost 20% of his force killed, wounded or taken prisoner.  Lieutenant Nielson, the officer in charge of the pickets, was court-martialed and cashiered from the militia for disobeying orders.

On May 11, Potter returned from his leave of absence and Lacey was relieved of his command.  Washington requested that Lacey remain with the militia for a short time in order to familiarize Potter with the region. By late June, the British had withdrawn from Philadelphia, and the militia's safeguarding of the region was no longer of concern to Washington.

Reported atrocities
Almost immediately after the battle, reports surfaced that British and Loyalist troops had committed atrocities, including the murder of prisoners-of-war and setting fire to the American wounded.  On May 7, Washington ordered Brigadier General William Maxwell to conduct an inquiry into these allegations so that a report could be made to General Howe.  Andrew Long, a justice of the peace in Bucks County, took the depositions of Colonel Watts and four residents who witnessed the battle: Samuel Henry, William Stayner, Thomas Craven and Samuel Erwin.  Watts reported "we found the bodies of the dead usid [sic] in a most inhuman & barbarous manner" and that "the most cruel Barbarity that had ever been exercised by any civilised Nation; nay, Savage barbarity in its utmost exertion of cruelty could but equal it."

Lacey's report to Major General John Armstrong further documented the atrocities: 
Some of the unfortunate, who fell into the merciless hands of the British, were more cruelly and inhumanely butchered. Some were set on fire with buckwheat straw, and others had their clothes burned on their backs. Some of the surviving sufferers say they saw the enemy set fire to wounded while yet alive, who struggled to put it out but were too weak and expired under the torture. I saw those lying in the buckwheat straw—they made a most melancholy appearance. Others I saw, who, after being wounded with a ball, had received near a dozen wounds with cutlasses and bayonets. I can find as many witnesses to the proof of the cruelties as there were people on the spot, and that was no small number who came as spectators. 
Among the many killed and wounded American soldiers were: George Matthews, 5th Battalion, Cumberland County Militia, wounded; John Poorman of Allen Township, soldier of the 5th Class, Third Battalion, Cumberland County Militia, killed and buried at Crooked Billet; Robert Montgomery, soldier of the 7th Battalion Cumberland County Militia, Captain Isaac Miller's Company, wounded; Aaron Penwell, Captain Walter Denny's Company, lost his arm in battle and was taken prisoner; Aaron Penwell of West Pensboro Township, 7th Battalion Militia, lost left arm; John Taylor(senior)of Greenwood Township, then Cumberland now Perry, 8th Battalion of Militia, wounded.

Order of battle

British and loyalist forces
 Queen's Rangers
 120 dragoons from the 17th Light Dragoons (under Major Crewe)
 1st and 2nd Light Infantry Battalions (see account by Sgt. Thomas Sullivan, 2nd Lt. Inf. Bn. in From Redcoat to Rebel: p. 215)
 Philadelphia Light Dragoons, also referred to as Hovenden's Royal Militia (under Captain Kerr)
 James' Troop of Provincial Dragoons (under Captain Jacob James)

American forces
 Pennsylvania Militia, Bucks County Regiment (under Captain William Pugh)
 Pennsylvania Militia, Cumberland County Regiments (under Colonels Frederick Watts and Abraham Smith)

References

Further reading
 Simcoe, John Graves. A Journal of the Operations of the Queen's Rangers. New York: The New York Times, 1968 (reprint).
 Smith, Charles Harper. "General Lacey's Campaign in 1778", Bulletin of the Historical Society of Montgomery County, Pennsylvania, Volume II (1941), No. 4, pp. 261–296.
 Smith, Charles Harper. "The Battle of the Billet Reviewed," Old York Road Historical Society Bulletin, Vol VI (1945) pp. 25–43.

External links

225th Anniversary Celebration Reenactment of the Battle of Crooked Billet
The Battle of The Crooked Billet Documentary Film

1778 in the United States
1778 in Pennsylvania
Conflicts in 1778
Crooked Billet
Crooked Billet
Crooked Billet
History of Montgomery County, Pennsylvania
Crooked Billet